A warehouse club (or wholesale club) is a retail store, usually selling a wide variety of merchandise, in which customers may  buy large, wholesale quantities of the store's products, which makes these clubs attractive to both bargain hunters and small business owners. The clubs are able to keep prices low due to the no-frills format of the stores. In addition, customers may be required to pay annual membership fees in order to shop.

Membership in a warehouse club superficially resembles that in a consumers' cooperative, but lacks key elements including cooperative ownership and democratic member control. The use of members' prices without cooperative ownership is also sometimes used in bars and casinos.

History

In 1971, the Great Atlantic and Pacific Tea Company (A&P) opened their very first Warehouse Economy Outlet (WEO), a warehouse format that only lasted a few years. 

In 1976, Sol Price (who in 1954 founded FedMart, an early US discount store) and his son Robert Price founded Price Club in San Diego, as their first warehouse club. 

In 1982, the discount pioneer John Geisse founded The Wholesale Club of Indianapolis, which he sold to Sam's Club in 1991.

In 1983, James (Jim) Sinegal and Jeffrey H. Brotman opened the first Costco warehouse in Seattle. Sinegal had started in wholesale distribution by working for Sol Price at FedMart. Also in 1993, Costco and Price Club agreed to merge operations, after Price declined an offer from Sam Walton and Walmart to merge Price Club with Sam's Club. Costco's business model and size were similar to those of Price Club, which made the merger more natural for both companies. The combined company took the name PriceCostco, and memberships became universal, meaning that a Price Club member could use their membership to shop at Costco and vice versa. PriceCostco boasted 206 locations generating $16billion in annual sales. PriceCostco was initially led by executives from both companies, but in 1994, the Price brothers left the company to form Price Enterprises, a warehouse club chain in Central America and the Caribbean unrelated to the current Costco.

In 1983, Kmart's Pace Membership Warehouse (later sold to Sam's Club) started operations. That same year, Sam Walton opened the first Sam's Club on April 7, in Midwest City, Oklahoma.

In 1984, former The Wholesale Club executives founded BJ's Wholesale Club, owned by Zayre.

In 1997, Costco changed its name to Costco Wholesale Corporation, and all remaining Price Club locations were rebranded 

, the three largest warehouse club chains operating in the United States are BJs, Costco, and Sam's Club. BJ's Wholesale Club is one of the smaller competitors, with stores located primarily in the Eastern United States. Costco and Sam's Club are the largest chains. Costco has locations in seven other nations and regions including Australia, Canada, Japan, Korea, Mexico, Taiwan, and the United Kingdom. Sam's Club, a division of Walmart, claims a membership base of 47 million persons and 602 stores across the United States (as of June 2019).

On July 16, 2020, it has been announced that Price Club will be returning to San Diego with new locations.

Examples
 BJ's Wholesale Club, operates in the U.S. only
 City Club, operates in Mexico only
 Costco, operates in the U.S., Canada, Mexico, the UK, Iceland, Australia, New Zealand, Sweden, Spain, France, South Korea, China, Japan and Taiwan
 Metro AG, headquartered in Germany, majority control in different regions by multiple third parties, Metro AG has 674 wholesale stores in 24 countries.
 PriceSmart, operates in Central America and Caribbean; previously operated in Asia-Pacific region
 Sam's Club, operates in the U.S., Mexico and other countries 
 Selgros, operates in Germany, Poland, Romania and Russia
 Wholesale Club, operates in Canada and Jamaica

Defunct
 American Wholesale Club (1986–1989)
 Buyers Club, a Denver-based independently owned chain
 Club Wholesale, turned into office supplies stores, then folded
 Fedco, bankruptcy in 1999 (most stores were bought by Target Stores)
 GEM & GEX  Membership Department Stores (required membership like a warehouse club)
 Gemco, 1959–1986, owned by Lucky Stores
 HomeClub, a home improvement warehouse, later became HomeBase and then folded in 2000
 Max-Club, owned by SuperValu (United States)
 PACE Membership Warehouse, owned by Kmart, merged with Sam's Club
 Price Club, merged with Costco in 1993
 Price Savers Wholesale Club, merged with PACE Warehouse Club, then merged with Sam's Club
 Sam's Club, in Canada 2003–2009
 SourceClub, owned by Meijer, from 1992 to 1994. Only had seven locations, all in Michigan, but helped loosen restrictions on who can become members industry-wide.
 Super Saver, merged with Sam's Club (Southeast US)
 The Wholesale Club, merged with Sam's Club
 Titan Warehouse Club Inc., an early warehouse concept in Canada based in Calgary with locations in Toronto/Kitchener/Stoney Creek areas in the 1985–1994
 Warehouse Club, was a public company

See also

Bulk foods
Cash and carry (wholesale)
Hypermarket

References

External links

Retail formats
Warehouses